WIZZ (1520 kHz) is a daytimer radio station licensed to serve Greenfield, Massachusetts, United States; 1520 AM is a United States clear-channel frequency. The station was owned by P. & M. Radio, LLC. It previously aired a locally programmed adult standards format, and played the national AP news feed on the hour and half-hour.

The station verified signal reports by QSL card. At the top of the hour, WIZZ used the same "V for Victory" time tone as WTIC in Hartford, Connecticut.

The station was assigned the WIZZ call letters by the Federal Communications Commission on February 1, 2003. The frequency was originally home to WPOE (Poet's Seat Broadcasting) in Greenfield, which first went on the air in 1980 with an adult contemporary format. By 1985, the call had changed to WGAM, with a format of Big Band/adult standards.

Its former owner and DJ, Phil D (Phillip Drumheller), was inducted into the Massachusetts Broadcasters Hall of Fame in 2010, and was active in broadcasting for 60 years; he is the first inductee into the MBHOF to have had his career outside the Boston market.

On April 6, 2022, Saga Communications acquired WIZZ and flipped it from adult standards to oldies as a simulcast of the HD3 subchannel of WLZX-FM.

References

External links
WIZZ official website

IZZ
Oldies radio stations in the United States
Mass media in Franklin County, Massachusetts
Greenfield, Massachusetts
Radio stations established in 1980
1980 establishments in Massachusetts
IZZ